The 2022–23 season is the 114th season in the existence of Fenerbahçe S.K. and the club's 65th consecutive season in the top flight of Turkish football. In addition to the domestic league, Fenerbahçe are participating in this season's edition of the Turkish Cup, UEFA Champions League and the UEFA Europa League.

Club

Board of Directors

Staff

Facilities

Kits
Fenerbahçe's 2022–23 kits, manufactured by Puma, released on 19 July 2022 and were up for sale on the same day.

Supplier: Puma
Main sponsor: Avis

Back sponsor: Halley
Sleeve sponsor: Nesine.com

Short sponsor: Aygaz, Pasha Group
Socks sponsor: —

Players

First-team squad

|-
|colspan=12 align=center|Players sold or loaned out after the start of the season

Transfers

In

Out

Total spending:  €41.61M 

Total income:  €29.25M 

Expenditure:  €12.36M

New contracts

Pre-season and friendlies

Pre-season

Mid-season

Competitions

Overall record

Süper Lig

League table

Results summary

Pld = Matches played; W = Matches won; D = Matches drawn; L = Matches lost; GF = Goals for; GA = Goals against; GD = Goal difference; Pts = Points

Results by round

Matches

Turkish Cup

UEFA Champions League

Second qualifying round

UEFA Europa League

Third qualifying round

Play-off round

Group stage

Knockout phase

Round of 16
As a result of finishing top of the group, Fenerbahçe advanced directly to the round of 16. The round of 16 draw was held on 24 February 2023. Fenerbahçe were a seeded team and drawn to play the second leg at home.

Statistics

Appearances and goals

|-
! colspan=14 style=background:#163962;color:#FDEF00; text-align:center| Goalkeepers

|-
! colspan=14 style=background:#163962;color:#FDEF00; text-align:center| Defenders

|-
! colspan=14 style=background:#163962;color:#FDEF00; text-align:center| Midfielders

|-
! colspan=14 style=background:#163962;color:#FDEF00; text-align:center| Forwards

|-
! colspan=14 style=background:#163962;color:#FDEF00; text-align:center| Players transferred/loaned out during the season

|}
 Last updated: 19 March 2023.

Goalscorers

 Last updated: 19 March 2023.

Assists

 Last updated: 19 March 2023.

Clean sheets

 Last updated: 16 March 2023.

Disciplinary record

 Last updated: 19 March 2023.

Notes

References

Fenerbahçe S.K. (football) seasons
Fenerbahçe